Mecheda railway station in the Indian state of West Bengal, serves Mecheda, India in Purba Medinipur district. It is on the Howrah–Kharagpur line.

History
It serves Mecheda town. It is a major railway station between Howrah and Kharagpur. Special EMU trains are available here, and local EMU trains Howrah–Panskura, Howrah–Balichak, Howrah–Kharagpur, Howrah–Medinipur, Howrah–Haldia stop here. The Howrah–Kharagpur line was opened in 1900. The Howrah–Panskura stretch has three lines. The Howrah–Kharagpur line was electrified in 1967–69.

References

External links
Trains at Mecheda

Railway stations in Purba Medinipur district
Kolkata Suburban Railway stations